Znojile is a small settlement in the hills above the Tuhinj Valley east of Kamnik in the Upper Carniola region of Slovenia.

Name
Znojile was attested in written sources circa 1400 as Snoynl (and as Snoyll in 1477). The name is derived from *znoji(d)lo 'sunny or sun-facing area' from the verb *znojiti 'to be warmed by the sun'. The name therefore refers to the geographical orientation of the place.

References

External links

Znojile on Geopedia

Populated places in the Municipality of Kamnik